Imre Markója (1931 – 27 March 2008) was a Hungarian politician and jurist, who served as Minister of Justice between 1978 and 1988.

References
 Nemzeti Emlékhely és Kegyeleti Bizottság - Halálozás (2008. január - 2008. december)

1931 births
2008 deaths
Hungarian communists
Justice ministers of Hungary